Hypseleotris aurea, the golden gudgeon, is a species of fish in the family Eleotridae endemic to Australia, where it is found in rocky pools in the Murchison and Gascoyne Rivers in Western Australia. It can be found in the aquarium trade.

References

External links
 Photograph

aurea
Freshwater fish of Western Australia
Taxonomy articles created by Polbot
Fish described in 1950